

Raffi Radio is a children's music concept album released by Raffi and Michael Creber in 1995.

The album is dedicated to Buckminster Fuller.

Concept 

Raffi Radio "mimics an old-time radio show", with children's songs interspersed with weather reports, guest interviews, and news segments.

Raffi and his puppet co-host Sleido JazzDog host the show from a radio station in the fictional location of Troubadouria.

Track listing

References 

1995 albums
Raffi (musician) albums
Concept albums